Sneaky Bat Machine (1997–2000) were a Bristol, UK based Cybergoth band who gigged heavily and released one album in the late 1990s. The band consisted of Sneakybat ( Ross Tregenza), Crash (a.k.a. Clive Lewis), and Maxislag (a.k.a. Maxi). Maxi was later replaced by Doktor A (a.k.a. Bruce Attley) after he left to join Katscan.

The band were well known for their unique stylings, a strange mix of cartoon gothic imagery and electropop musical backing. Song subjects were equally outlandish, covering subjects such as grave-robbing and fighting space invaders. They became unwitting spokesmen for the fledgling British cybergoth genre of music (characterized by light electronic music mixed with industrial vocals, but more widely known for its followers' crazy hairstyles and colourful, outlandish fashion sense).

They released two official CDs, and countless tape and CD demos. Their first commercial release for the Boneshaker CD Single on Darkbeat Records in 1998, followed by Disco 4 The Dead, also on Darkbeat Records, in 1999. Both releases are now deleted and Sneaky Bat Machine's music is only available from https://web.archive.org/web/20051103115606/http://www.goteki-store.com/ as mp3 releases, compiled as Disco 4 The Dead 2: Another Dementia.

In 2000 the band changed its name to Goteki, and began a new career as 'lo-fi phuturists'. Goteki released a number of albums and received some notable success, before disbanding in 2006. Goteki reformed in 2008 and released the Santa Muerte album in 2010.

Musical groups from Bristol
British industrial music groups